Berwick Barracks, sometimes known as Ravensdowne Barracks, is a former military installation of the British Army in Berwick-upon-Tweed, England.

History
The barracks were built between 1717 and 1721 by Nicholas Hawksmoor for the Board of Ordnance to protect the town during the Jacobite risings. The work, which involved two parallel blocks of military accommodation, was supervised by Captain Thomas Phillips. An additional block was added between 1739 and 1741. After the Napoleonic Wars the barracks were abandoned but put back into use in the 1850s.

Following the Childers Reforms, the barracks became the depot of the King's Own Scottish Borderers, who arrived from Fulford Barracks in July 1881. The regiment moved out of the barracks in 1963 and they are now maintained by English Heritage.

Museum
The museum hosts an exhibition entitled "By Beat of Drum" which shows the life of the British infantryman. It also houses the last colours of the King's Own Scottish Borderers before it was amalgamated into the Royal Regiment of Scotland in 2006.

References

External links
 Berwick-upon-Tweed Barracks and Main Guard - official site at English Heritage

Barracks in England
Installations of the British Army
Regimental museums in England
Berwick-upon-Tweed
English Heritage sites in Northumberland
Museums in Northumberland